Wayne Raw (born 2 November 1994) is a Namibian first-class cricketer. He played in the 2014 ICC Under-19 Cricket World Cup.

References

External links
 

1994 births
Living people
Namibian cricketers
Place of birth missing (living people)